The Bosch Sports Car Oktoberfest was the ninth round of the 1999 FIA GT Championship season.  It took place at Watkins Glen International, New York, United States, on October 3, 1999.

As with the previous FIA GT event, this race was originally intended to share the weekend with a United States Road Racing Championship event.  However, the USRRC championship was cancelled midway through the season, leaving the FIA GT Championship to run on their own.  In order to increase the number of participants for the FIA GT event, as well as to allow USRRC teams to compete, a National GT (N-GT) designation was used for cars which had run in the USRRC's GT2 and GT3 classes.  Cars running in the N-GT class would not be eligible for points in the FIA GT Championship.

This race would also be the last time that the FIA GT Championship would run in North America.

Official results
Class winners are in bold.  Cars failing to complete 70% of winner's distance are marked as Not Classified (NC).

Statistics
 Pole position – #2 Viper Team Oreca – 1:47.576
 Fastest lap – #2 Viper Team Oreca – 1:47.717
 Average speed – 171.297 km/h

References

 
 
 

W
FIA GT Watkins Glen